Schistura defectiva is a species of ray-finned fish in the stone loach genus Schistura from Laos.

References 

D
Fish described in 2000